WHO Goodwill Ambassador is an official postnominal honorific title, title of authority, legal status and job description assigned to those goodwill ambassadors and advocates who are designated by the United Nations. WHO goodwill ambassadors are celebrity advocates of the World Health Organization (WHO) and use their talent and fame to advocate for health and well-being.

Current WHO goodwill ambassadors
Current goodwill ambassadors, and the year they were appointed:

Cancellation of status
On 21 October 2017 the WHO Director-General Tedros Adhanom Ghebreyesus appointed Zimbabwe’s president Robert Mugabe as a WHO goodwill ambassador to help tackle non-communicable diseases for Africa. The appointment address praised Mugabe for his commitment to public health in Zimbabwe. The naming attracted widespread condemnation in WHO member states and international organisations due to Mugabe's poor record on human rights and presiding over a decline in Zimbabwe's public health. Following widespread criticism, Tedros Adhanom was forced to withdraw the appointment (cancel the title) the next day.

See also 
 Goodwill Ambassador
 FAO Goodwill Ambassador
 UNDP Goodwill Ambassador
 UNHCR Goodwill Ambassador
 UNESCO Goodwill Ambassador
 UNODC Goodwill Ambassador
 UNFPA Goodwill Ambassador
 UN Women Goodwill Ambassador
 UNIDO Goodwill Ambassador
 UNICEF Goodwill Ambassador
 WFP Goodwill Ambassador
 United Nations Messengers of Peace

References

External links
 WHO Goodwill Ambassadors

World Health Organization
Goodwill ambassador programmes
United Nations goodwill ambassadors